Ixodes affinis is a species of tick in the genus Ixodes. Some reported hosts are:
Thryothorus ludovicianus (Georgia)
Blarina carolinensis (Georgia)
Scalopus aquaticus (Georgia)
Odocoileus virginianus (Georgia)
Oryzomys palustris (Georgia)
Peromyscus gossypinus (Georgia)
Sciurus carolinensis (Georgia)
Procyon lotor (Georgia)

See also
List of parasites of the marsh rice rat

References

Literature cited
Wilson, N. and Durden, L.A. 2003. Ectoparasites of terrestrial vertebrates inhabiting the Georgia Barrier Islands, USA: an inventory and preliminary biogeographical analysis (subscription required). Journal of Biogeography 30(8):1207–1220.

affinis
Endemic fauna of Georgia (U.S. state)